Sultan Al-Mantheri (Arabic:سلطان المنذري) (born 5 January 1995) is an Emirati footballer. He currently plays as a goalkeeper for Al Ain.

Career

Al-Jazira
Al-Mantheri started his career at Al-Jazira and is a product of the Al-Jazira's youth system.

Dibba Al-Fujairah
On 18 July 2015, Al-Mantheri left Al-Jazira and signed with Dibba Al-Fujairah on loan of season.

Al-Wasl
On 15 July 2016, he left Al-Jazira Permanently and signed with Al-Wasl. On 16 September 2017, Al-Mantheri made his professional debut for Al-Wasl against Al Ain in the Pro League, replacing Yousif Al-Zaabi.

External links

References

1995 births
Living people
Emirati footballers
Olympic footballers of the United Arab Emirates
United Arab Emirates international footballers
Al Jazira Club players
Dibba FC players
Al-Wasl F.C. players
Al Ain FC players
UAE Pro League players
Association football goalkeepers
Place of birth missing (living people)
Footballers at the 2018 Asian Games
Asian Games bronze medalists for the United Arab Emirates
Asian Games medalists in football
Medalists at the 2018 Asian Games